Cirrhopetalum maculosum is an orchid species in the genus Cirrhopetalum.

Cirrhopetalanthrin is a dimeric phenanthrene derivative from C. maculosum.

References

External links 

 Cirrhopetalum maculosum at tropicos.org

Bulbophyllinae
Plants described in 1841